Laucha an der Unstrut is a town in the Burgenlandkreis district, in Saxony-Anhalt, Germany. It is situated on the river Unstrut, northwest of Naumburg. It is part of the Verbandsgemeinde ("collective municipality") Unstruttal. On 1 July 2009 it absorbed the former municipalities Burgscheidungen and Kirchscheidungen.

References

Burgenlandkreis